Dornakal Junction railway station (station code: DKJ) falls under South Central Railway zone of Indian Railways.

Overview 
Most of the trains running on Kazipet–Vijayawada section pass through the station and serve 27000 passengers daily. There are about nine trains which start/pass from the station.

Passenger MEMU and DEMU trains:

 –Bhadrachalam Passenger
 Manuguru– Passenger
 Vijayawada–Dornakal Junction Passenger
 Vijayawada–Kazipet Passenger

References 

Railway stations in Hanamkonda district
Secunderabad railway division
Railway junction stations in Telangana